Cynthia Amuzu (born 1965) is a former Ghanaian badminton player. Amuzu clinched the doubles title at the 1989 Ghana International tournament, and won the women's and mixed doubles event.

Achievements

BWF International Challenge/Series
Women's doubles

Mixed doubles

References

External links
 

1965 births
Living people
Ghanaian female badminton players